Longpré may refer to:

People
 Bernard Longpré (1937–2002), Canadian film director and animator
 Celeste de Longpré Heckscher (1860–1928), American composer
 Charles Lemercier de Longpré, baron d'Haussez (1778–1854), French politician and government minister
 Irène du Buisson de Longpré (ca. 1720–1767), French noblewoman, mistress to Louis XV of France
 Nathan Longpre (born 1988), Canadian professional ice hockey player
 Paul de Longpré (1855–1911), French painter

Places
Longpré-le-Sec, a commune in the Aube department in France.
Longpré-les-Corps-Saints, a commune in the Somme department in France
Longpré-les-Corps-Saints station, a railway station in Longpré-les-Corps-Saints
Saint-Amand-Longpré a commune in the Loir-et-Cher department in France

French-language surnames